The liquidation of Bahamas-based cryptocurrency exchange FTX began in November 2022. The collapse of FTX, caused by a liquidity crisis of the company's token, FTT, served as the impetus for its bankruptcy. Prior to its collapse, FTX was the third-largest cryptocurrency exchange by volume and had over one million users.

On 2 November 2022, CoinDesk published an article stating that Alameda Research, a trading firm affiliated with FTX and owned by FTX chief executive Sam Bankman-Fried, held a significant amount of FTX's exchange token, FTT. Following the allegations, Binance—a competing cryptocurrency exchange and a prior investor in FTX—announced it would sell its FTT, leading the market price of the token to crash. The move also triggered a spike in withdrawals from FTX, causing the exchange to freeze withdrawals and creating a liquidity crisis. On 8 November, Binance signed an offer to acquire FTX, but then withdrew the offer. On 11 November, FTX, Alameda Research, and over 100 affiliated entities declared bankruptcy. Bankman-Fried resigned as FTX CEO and was replaced by John J. Ray III.

The collapse of FTX has had a wide impact on cryptocurrency markets, with comparisons made to the Enron scandal and Madoff investment scandal, and was described by federal prosecutors as "one of the biggest financial frauds in American history." Following the bankruptcy, the Securities Commission of the Bahamas froze the assets of one of FTX's subsidiaries. Bankman-Fried's net worth, estimated at $16 billion prior to the collapse, was reported as having been wiped out, and several institutional investors of FTX wrote off their investment stakes in the company. Some $473 million in funds were later taken from FTX in an "unauthorized transaction". The collapse of FTX has resulted in a ripple effect across the cryptocurrency industry, with the price of Bitcoin falling to its lowest level in two years.

Anonymous sources cited by the Wall Street Journal  10 November 2022 stated that FTX had lent $10 billion from customers' accounts to fund Alameda Research earlier in 2022, a move forbidden by FTX's terms of service. The same sources stated that Bankman-Fried, Alameda Research CEO Caroline Ellison, and other FTX executives were aware of the decision.

FTX and its handling of customer funds is under investigation by the Securities and Exchange Commission (SEC), the Commodity Futures Trading Commission (CFTC) and the Department of Justice (DOJ) in the United States; and a criminal investigation by the Royal Bahamas Police Force and the Securities Commission in the Bahamas. Anonymous sources cited by Reuters said that between $1 billion and $2 billion in consumer funds could not be accounted for.

Background

Sam Bankman-Fried co-founded Alameda Research, a cryptocurrency trading firm, in 2017. In 2019, Bankman-Fried had the idea of starting a cryptocurrency exchange to help bring in revenue to fund Alameda's activities, and founded FTX. Bankman-Fried was the CEO of both companies until he formally stepped down from his position at Alameda in October 2021, promoting traders Caroline Ellison and Sam Trabucco to co-CEOs. Ellison was reported to have a romantic involvement with Bankman-Fried. As of August 2021, Bankman-Fried still owned 90% of Alameda.

The close relationship and potential conflicts of interest between Alameda and FTX drew scrutiny from the rest of the cryptocurrency industry. Alameda was once the largest trader on FTX, bringing liquidity to the exchange. Between 1 June 2022 and 22 July 2022, Alameda's known wallets were the largest stablecoin depositors and sources of liquidity to all of FTX's known wallet addresses, accounting for 10% of Tether transfers and 30% of USD Coin transfers on the exchange. According to John J. Ray III, Alameda had a "secret exemption" from FTX's auto-liquidation protocol.

Alameda Research suffered a series of losses in May and June 2022, which anonymous sources told The Wall Street Journal resulted in FTX lending the trading firm more than half of its customer funds, a decision that the sources said FTX CEO Sam Bankman-Fried described as a 'poor judgment call'. This was explicitly forbidden by FTX's terms-of-service. On 12 November 2022, The Wall Street Journal reported that anonymous sources had said that Alameda CEO Caroline Ellison said that she, Bankman-Fried, Gary Wang, and Nishad Singh were aware of that decision. The same was reported on The New York Times on 14 November 2022. FTX used software to conceal the misuse of customer funds.

In the days leading up to the crisis, CoinDesk reported that Alameda Research held a significant amount of FTT, and that these FTT holdings made up a considerable portion of their assets. CoinDesk reported that there were $5.1 billion worth of FTT tokens in circulation, and that Alameda's balance sheet held $3.66 billion of "unlocked FTT", $2.16 billion of "FTT collateral", and $292 million of "locked FTT". Following months of arguments and disagreements between Changpeng Zhao, the CEO of Binance, and Bankman-Fried, tensions between the two had intensified days before the crisis. Zhao's firm Binance had obtained $2.1 billion in Binance USD and FTT coins in 2021, following a deal in which FTX bought back an equity stake held by Binance in FTX, and in early November 2022 it had 23 million FTT tokens, worth about $529 million at the time.

Timeline

Binance divestment and proposed acquisition

On 7 November 2022, Zhao announced that Binance had intended to sell its holdings in FTT. The sale of Binance's holdings in FTT, compounded with the low trading volume of FTT and the enmity between Zhao and Bankman-Fried, resulted in the price of the token plummeting.  Binance had received FTT from FTX in 2021 during a transaction in which FTX bought back Binance's equity stake in FTX. Zhao cited "recent revelations that came to light" as the motivation for selling FTT. Bloomberg and TechCrunch reported that any sale by Binance would likely have an outsized impact on FTT's price, given the token's low trading volume. The announcement by Zhao of the pending sale and disputes between Zhao and Bankman-Fried on Twitter led to a decline in the price of FTT and other cryptocurrencies, resulting in $6 billion of customer withdrawals from FTX. FTX became unable to meet the demand for further withdrawals, and on 8 November, Bankman-Fried and Zhao jointly announced Binance had entered into a non-binding agreement to purchase FTX to ensure that customers could recover their assets in a timely manner. The deal did not include the sale of FTX.US. Zhao announced on Twitter that the company would complete due diligence soon, adding that all crypto exchanges should avoid using tokens as collateral. He also wrote that he expected FTT to be "highly volatile in the coming days as things develop". On the day of that announcement, FTT lost 80 percent of its value.

Binance acquisition dropped
On 9 November, Bloomberg called the acquisition of FTX by Binance "unlikely" due to the poor state of FTX's finances. Bloomberg also reported that the United States Securities and Exchange Commission and Commodity Futures Trading Commission were investigating the nature of FTX's connections to Bankman-Fried's other holdings and its handling of client funds. Later that day, the Wall Street Journal reported that Binance would not move forward with the deal to acquire FTX. Binance cited FTX's reported mishandling of customer funds and pending investigations of FTX as the reasons for not pursuing the deal. Bankman-Fried said in a Slack message that FTX had learned through the press about Binance's concerns and decision.

Collapse and further rescue attempts
On 9 November, FTX's website said that it was not processing withdrawals at that time. Bankman-Fried said that although the firm's assets were worth more than its clients' deposits, it would need funds from outside to meet demand for withdrawals due to a lack of liquidity. Bankman-Fried stated on 9 November that FTX.US, as a separate company, was "not currently impacted" by the crisis.

On 10 November, Axios reported that FTX approached Kraken for a potential rescue deal. Bankman-Fried made several statements on 10 November, taking responsibility for FTX's failure and indicating that FTX was attempting to raise $10 billion in emergency financing to remain solvent. Bankman-Fried also announced that Alameda Research would cease trading and end operations. FTX's in-house legal and compliance teams had, for the most part, resigned by 10 November. Anonymous sources cited by the Wall Street Journal on 10 November said that Alameda Research owed FTX some $10 billion, as FTX had lent funds placed on the exchange for trading to Alameda so that Alameda could make investments with the money.

Though Bankman-Fried said that FTX.US customers did not have reason to worry on Twitter on 10 November, employees began attempting to sell assets belonging to the firm on the same day. These assets include stock-clearing company Embed Financial Technologies and the naming rights to FTX Arena. Disagreements emerged between remaining executives, with Bankman-Fried and FTX COO Constance Wang resisting urges from Ryne Miller, a member of FTX US's legal team, to end trading on the exchanges. Bankman-Fried continued to seek funding even as Miller informed other executives that he believed there was a "0%" chance of securing further investment. Miller and other executives asked Bankman-Fried to concede control of FTX US to them, which he resisted. On 11 November, Bankman-Fried announced that he had filed FTX US for bankruptcy along with FTX and Alameda. Bankman-Fried continued to seek capital for FTX after the bankruptcy, and claimed without evidence that a potential backer had emerged soon after the filing.

On 12 November, anonymous sources cited by the Wall Street Journal said Alameda CEO Caroline Ellison disclosed to other Alameda employees that she, Sam Bankman-Fried, Gary Wang, and Nishad Singh knew that client deposits were transferred from FTX to Alameda. An anonymous source cited by the New York Times on 14 November said the same. Anonymous sources cited by the Wall Street Journal said the funds were used in part to pay back loans Alameda had taken to make investments. On 10 November, the Securities Commission of the Bahamas froze the assets of one of FTX's subsidiaries, FTX Digital Markets Ltd, "and related parties", and provisionally appointed an attorney as liquidator. Japan's Financial Services Agency ordered FTX Japan to suspend some operations. The company's Australian subsidiary was placed under administration.

On the same day, a team running the FTX Future Fund, a charitable group bankrolled by Bankman-Fried, announced their collective resignations. Future Fund had committed $160 million in charitable grants and investments by 1 September of that year.

Bankruptcy
On 11 November, FTX, FTX US, Alameda Research, and more than 100 affiliates filed for bankruptcy in Delaware. Anonymous sources cited by the New York Times said that the exchange owes as much as $8 billion. The crypto lender BlockFi, which was affiliated with FTX, announced on 10 November that it was suspending operations as a result of FTX's collapse. Bankman-Fried resigned as CEO and was replaced by John J. Ray III, a corporate restructuring specialist who previously oversaw the liquidation of Enron. As of 12 November, Bankman-Fried told Reuters that he was still in the Bahamas, though other high-ranking FTX employees had begun leaving for Hong Kong, the location of the company's former headquarters, or other locations. Authorities in the Bahamas, including the Royal Bahamas Police Force, questioned Bankman-Fried on 12 November. Despite FTX's bankruptcy, Bankman-Fried continued to attempt to raise money for the firm during the weekend of 12 and 13 November.

Unauthorized transactions
Late on 11 November, some $473 million in funds were removed from FTX through what Ryne Miller, FTX US's general counsel, characterized as "unauthorized transactions". Miller further announced that FTX and FTX US intended to move remaining funds denominated in cryptocurrency to offline "cold storage". The funds taken from FTX were mostly stablecoins such as Tether, and were quickly exchanged for Ether, a method used by cryptocurrency thieves to thwart attempts to retrieve stolen funds. A person speaking on behalf of FTX in a Telegram chat referred to the "unauthorized transactions" as a "hack" and encouraged users to delete FTX mobile apps as they were compromised. Kraken has since announced its assistance in identifying the perpetrator. On 14 November, Kraken's chief security officer said on Twitter that the firm knew "the identity" of a user who paid transaction fees associated with moving the stolen money through their Kraken account. In an interview with Kelsey Piper published 16 November by Vox, Bankman-Fried blamed an "ex-employee" or malware on a device owned by an ex-employee for the theft.

Between $1 billion and $2 billion in customer funds reportedly could not be accounted for as of 12 November. The Financial Times reported that FTX's balance sheet shortly before the bankruptcy showed $9 billion in liabilities against $900 million in liquid assets, $5 billion in "less liquid" assets, and $3.2 billion in illiquid private equity investments. American columnist Matt Levine described that among its less liquid assets that "[FTX] relied on to be able to pay out customer balances" were two tokens that "it had just made up", referring to the FTX Token and Serum, a separate cryptocurrency accounted for in the balance sheet.

Contagion fears and impact on cryptocurrency markets
Cryptocurrencies experienced swings and declines in value as news of FTX's collapse first emerged in early November: Tether dropped below its peg price of $1.00 to $0.97 and Bitcoin sank to its lowest price in two years. Share prices for publicly traded cryptocurrency companies declined. The price of Solana, which was affiliated with Bankman-Fried, declined as well. The crisis at FTX has inspired an increase in withdrawals from other exchanges. A decline in the value of Cronos, the token of exchange Crypto.com, triggered fears of the potential for a collapse similar to that of FTX and spurred withdrawals from the platform. CEO Kris Marszalek provided assurances that the firm was liquid and that it did not use Cronos in a manner similar to the way FTX used FTT. Bloomberg reported that the collapse of FTX exacerbated institutional skepticism of cryptocurrencies as an asset class.

BlockFi, a  cryptocurrency lender, filed for Chapter 11 bankruptcy protection on 28 November; the firm had earlier begun preventing withdrawals. The company disclosed "significant exposure" to FTX on 14 November. Another cryptocurrency lender, Genesis, a subsidiary of Digital Currency Group, halted withdrawals on 16 November. This halt caused Gemini, an exchange owned by the Winklevoss twins, to cease allowing redemptions for clients using a service provided through a partnership with Genesis. Another Digital Currency Group subsidiary, Grayscale, saw the value of its flagship offering, the publicly traded Grayscale Bitcoin Trust, decline by 20% over the two weeks preceding 17 November. Grayscale Bitcoin Trust was trading at a discounted price, 42% below the value of its Bitcoin, as of 14 November.

Contagion in progress and huge financial losses
Concerns have also been raised about Silvergate Bank, as FTX was a depositor and could have also been a source of credit exposure. Silvergate has said that it has ample liquidity and no loan exposure to FTX. These concerns have been magnified due to Silvergate's key role as a gateway between its cryptocurrency clients and the wider financial world.

Bankruptcy of Silvergate Bank

Silvergate Bank covered colossal losses on the bankruptcy of FTX. On 9 March 2023 Silvergate Bank announced it would wind down its operations and undergo liquidation, in turn creating a domino effect of chain insolvencies. Shortly afterwards, two more banks associated with cryptocurrency failed. On 10 March 2023, Silicon Valley Bank collapsed in the second largest bank failure in United States history and was placed in receivership of the Federal Deposit Insurance Corporation. Two days later, on 12 March 2023, Signature Bank, who catered to operators such as Binance and Celsius Network, collapsed after being closed by the New York State Department of Financial Services after being designated a systemic risk following a run. After SVBs collapse, Signature Bank's collapse was the third largest in United States history.

Investigations

Lawsuits and legal involvement
Following the collapse of FTX, the Royal Bahamas Police Force launched a criminal investigation into the company.

Anonymous sources cited by Bloomberg said that the office of the United States Attorney for the Southern District of New York had begun an investigation into FTX's collapse as of 14 November.

The United States House Committee on Financial Services plans to conduct hearings in December on the collapse of FTX, and committee leaders said they would seek testimony from Bankman-Fried.

On 15 November 2022, a class-action lawsuit was filed in Miami against Bankman-Fried and several celebrities, including American football quarterback Tom Brady and comedian Larry David, alleging the company engaged in deceptive practices; they are seeking damages. The lawsuit also named Gisele Bündchen, Steph Curry, Shaquille O'Neal, Udonis Haslem, David Ortiz, Trevor Lawrence, Shohei Ohtani, Naomi Osaka, and Kevin O'Leary.

On 21 December 2022, both Carline Ellison (former CEO of Alameda) and Gary Wang (former Chief Technology Officer of FTX) pled guilty to fraud and other charges and were cooperating with federal investigators in criminal case against Sam Bankman-Fried. In the signed agreements Ellison and Wang agreed to "cooperate fully" and "truthfully and completely disclose all information concerning all matters". On 3 January 2023, Bankman-Fried pled not guilty to fraud and other charges, and a trial was set October 2023.

Impact

Effects on other firms
On 16 November 2022, the cryptocurrency brokerage service Genesis suspended withdrawals following FTX declaring bankruptcy, further affecting the industry. The cryptocurrency exchange company Gemini, owned by Cameron and Tyler Winklevoss,  announced that it would be pausing withdrawals on its Earn program, which uses Genesis as a lending partner.

The exchange token of Crypto.com, Cronos, lost approximately $1 billion in value in November. On 14 November, Crypto.com's CEO assured users that the exchange was functioning as normal. Commenters and customers remained fearful that Crypto.com could experience a collapse similar to FTX.

Losses by FTX investors and customers
Institutional investors that stand to lose money due to their stakes in FTX include Tiger Global Management, the Ontario Teachers' Pension Plan, SoftBank Group, BlackRock, Lightspeed Venture Partners, Temasek, and Sequoia Capital. Sequoia Capital wrote down its equity in FTX to $0 on 9 November, losing some $214 million. Sequoia released a notice to investors, also published on Twitter, assuring them the firm's stake in FTX represented a small amount of its overall portfolio, and replaced a profile of Bankman-Fried published on the firm's website with a link to the same notice. The Ontario Teachers' Pension Plan released a similar statement.

BlockFi, a cryptocurrency lender, was reportedly taking steps to file for bankruptcy as of 15 November, having earlier halted withdrawals. The company disclosed "significant exposure" to FTX on 14 November. Another cryptocurrency lender, Genesis, a subsidiary of Digital Currency Group, halted withdrawals on 16 November. This halt caused Gemini to cease allowing redemptions for clients using a service provided through a partnership with Genesis. BlockFi confirmed speculation by filing for Chapter 11 bankruptcy protection in the United States on 28 November.

Cryptocurrency investment firms with assets still held on FTX after its bankruptcy include Galois Capital and Galaxy Digital. Several public figures also invested in FTX or received compensation for promoting the company. These include former couple Tom Brady and Gisele Bundchen, as well as Shaquille O'Neal, Stephen Curry, and Kevin O'Leary. According to anonymous sources cited by The Information, some venture capital firms are considering lawsuits against Bankman-Fried.

Anthony Scaramucci, founder of SkyBridge Capital, announced the firm was attempting to buy back a 30% stake in the business owned by FTX.

Commentary and reactions
Jim Chanos predicted the collapse of FTX would lead to increased scrutiny and regulation of cryptocurrencies. Chanos further criticized the cryptocurrency sector as "designed to extract fees from really unsuspecting investors". Richard Handler, CEO of American financial firm Jefferies Group, tweeted on 10 November that he had attempted to meet with Bankman-Fried in July and again in September as he perceived he was "in over his head". Handler stated that Bankman-Fried did not respond to the emails sent from Jefferies staff sent on Handler's behalf. The sudden collapse of FTX has been compared to the bankruptcy of Lehman Brothers by writers in publications including The New York Times and the Financial Times, with some deeming FTX's collapse as "crypto's Lehman moment". Lawrence Summers acknowledged the comparisons to Lehman and further compared the collapse to the Enron scandal, caused by fraud perpetrated by Enron executives. Rostin Behnam, the Chairman of the Commodity Futures Trading Commission, called for Congress to grant the organization more power to regulate cryptocurrencies. Risk management firm Titan Grey published a primer on the commencement and early motions practice of the FTX chapter 11 case, analyzing issues such as creditor privacy, relief from the automatic stay, proposed differential treatment of customers from other creditors, and others.

Impact on effective altruism
The FTX collapse resulted in scrutiny and a loss of funding for the effective altruism movement, which Bankman-Fried had funded using profits from FTX. Some commentators stated that EA's endorsement of ends–means reasoning and longtermism motivated the leaders of FTX to engage in risky and unethical behavior. However, several leaders of the EA movement, including William MacAskill and Robert Wiblin, condemned FTX's actions.

Prior to the collapse, Bankman-Fried and other senior leaders of FTX and Alameda were altogether worth approximately $16.5 billion, making them the second-largest group of benefactors to the EA movement after Open Philanthropy and Good Ventures. On 10 November, the team running the FTX Future Fund, a charitable group bankrolled by Bankman-Fried, announced that they had resigned earlier that day. Future Fund had committed $160 million in charitable grants and investments by 1 September of that year.

Notes

References

2022 in the Bahamas
2022 scandals
Companies that filed for Chapter 11 bankruptcy in 2022
Corporate scandals
Corporate crime
Digital currency exchanges